The State Bureau of Investigation (DBR, Ukrainian: Державне Бюро Розслідувань, ДБР) is a law enforcement agency of Ukraine that investigates criminal proceedings involving law enforcement officers, judges, and high-ranking officials. Gradually, the DBR took over the function of preparatory proceedings from the prosecutor's office.

History 
The State Bureau of Investigation was established by the law signed by the President of Ukraine on 14 January 2016, and resolution of the CabMin no. 127.

References  

Law enforcement agencies of Ukraine
Organizations based in Kyiv
2016 establishments in Ukraine